Shai Moshe Piron (born 25 January 1965) is an Israeli Orthodox rabbi, educator, and politician. A religious Zionist, he served as a member of the Knesset for Yesh Atid between 2013 and 2015, and as Minister of Education between 2013 and 2014.

Biography
Born in Kfar Vitkin, Piron was ordained as a rabbi, and co-headed the hesder yeshiva in Petah Tikva. Piron is the CEO of "Hakol L'Chinuch", which works to improve state education. He helped found Tzohar, and runs numerous projects to foster harmony between religious and secular Israelis.

In 2012, he joined the newly formed Yesh Atid party, and was placed second in its list for the 2013 Knesset elections. With the party winning 19 seats, he became a member of the Knesset. Yesh Atid joined the coalition, and Piron was appointed as Minister of Education replacing Gideon Sa’ar.

In March 2015, Piron called for Israel to have all schools include the "Nakba" in their curriculum: "I'm for teaching the Nakba to all students in Israel. I do not think that a student can go through the Israeli educational system, while 20% of students have an ethos, a story, and he does not know that story." He added that covering the topic in schools could address some of the racial tensions that exist in Israeli society. Piron's comments broke a taboo in the traditional Israeli narrative, and conflicts with efforts on the part of some Israeli lawmakers to defund schools that mark the "Nakba".

He was placed second on the party's list again for the 2015 elections, and was re-elected as the party won 11 seats. Following the elections, he was appointed Deputy Speaker of the Knesset.

In September 2015, Piron resigned from the Knesset, and will instead teach at a college in Sderot. He was replaced by Elazar Stern, twelfth on the Yesh Atid list.

Piron lives in Oranit, is married, and has six children.

References

External links

1965 births
Living people
20th-century Israeli educators
21st-century Israeli educators
Israeli settlers
Members of the 19th Knesset (2013–2015)
Members of the 20th Knesset (2015–2019)
Ministers of Education of Israel
Moshavniks
People from Kfar Vitkin
Israeli Orthodox Jews
Religious Zionist Orthodox rabbis
Yesh Atid politicians
Academic staff of Ono Academic College
Israeli people of Egyptian-Jewish descent
Israeli people of Romanian-Jewish descent